Nicky Blair's was a high-end Italian restaurant on the Sunset Strip on Sunset Boulevard in Los Angeles, next to Le Dome. It thrived in the late 1980s and early 1990s. It was named after the proprietor, Nicky Blair, a bit-part film actor who starred in over 75 movies. He established it in 1986 and ran it until his death from liver cancer in 1998, although he spent his last years in Las Vegas attempting to establish another restaurant there.

Service
The restaurant, with a piano bar, served Italian and continental cuisine, including freshly made pasta, scampi, scallopini, and grilled fish and meat dishes. A 1991 edition of LA Access described it as a "Noisy, crowded, and glitzy singles bar", which was "good for star-gazing".

Notable patrons
The restaurant was a favorite evening haunt of numerous actors and celebrities, such as Frank Sinatra, a close friend of Blair's, and the Rat Pack. Sinatra and friends would play poker in the kitchen to escape the attention of fans and the press. In one incident:

Clint Eastwood celebrated his 1992 Oscar success at the restaurant. Sylvester Stallone also frequented Nicky Blair's and would take his dates there.

References

1986 establishments in California
Defunct Italian restaurants in the United States
Defunct restaurants in Los Angeles
European restaurants in Los Angeles
Italian restaurants in California
Restaurants established in 1986